The 1964 Nebraska Cornhuskers football team was the representative of the University of Nebraska and member of the Big Eight Conference in the 1964 NCAA University Division football season. The team was coached by Bob Devaney and played their home games at Memorial Stadium in Lincoln, Nebraska.

Schedule

Roster

Coaching staff

Game summaries

South Dakota

Minnesota

Iowa State

South Carolina

Kansas State

Colorado

Missouri

Kansas

Oklahoma State

Oklahoma

Arkansas

Rankings

Awards
 All American: Larry Kramer
 National Lineman of the Year: Robert Brown
 All Big 8: Walt Barnes, Tony Jeter, Larry Kramer, Kent McCloughan, Lyle Sittler, Freeman White, Ted Vactor

Future professional players
 James Brown, 1966 13th-round pick of the St. Louis Cardinals
 Dick Czap, 1966 12th-round pick of the Cleveland Browns
 Tony Jeter, 1966 3rd-round pick of the Green Bay Packers
Larry Kramer, 1964 15th-round pick of the Baltimore Colts
 Preston Love, 1965 19th-round pick of the Detroit Lions
Kent McCloughan, 1965 3rd-round pick of the Washington Redskins
 Lynn Senkbeil, 1966 16th-round pick of the Chicago Bears
 Freeman White, 1966 9th-round pick of the New York Giants

References

Nebraska
Nebraska Cornhuskers football seasons
Big Eight Conference football champion seasons
Nebraska Cornhuskers football